"The Cowgirl and the Dandy" is a song written by Bobby Goldsboro and performed by Brenda Lee. The song reached No. 10 on the U.S. country chart and No. 8 on the Canadian country chart in 1980. It was featured on her 1980 album, Even Better.

The song was produced by Ron Chancey and arranged by Bergen White.

Other versions
Goldsboro originally released the song in 1977 entitled "The Cowboy and the Lady".  It reached No. 85 on the U.S. country chart.
John Denver released a gender-reversed version of the song in 1981 entitled "The Cowboy and the Lady" that reached #50 on the U.S. county chart and #66 on the Billboard Hot 100.  It was featured on his 1981 album, Some Days Are Diamonds.
Dolly Parton included the song on her 1977 Here You Come Again album.

References 

Songs about cowboys and cowgirls
1977 songs
1977 singles
1980 singles
1981 singles
Brenda Lee songs
Bobby Goldsboro songs
John Denver songs
Songs written by Bobby Goldsboro
Song recordings produced by Ron Chancey
MCA Records singles
Epic Records singles
RCA Records singles